Sayan Ghosh (born 16 September 1992) is an Indian cricketer who plays for Bengal. He made his first-class debut on 7 November 2015 in the 2015–16 Ranji Trophy. In February 2017, he was bought by the Kolkata Knight Riders team for the 2017 Indian Premier League for 10 lakhs. In January 2018, he was bought by the Delhi Capitals in the 2018 IPL auction.

See also
 List of Bengal cricketers

References

External links
 

1992 births
Living people
Indian cricketers
Bengal cricketers
People from Nadia district